This is a non-exhaustive list of the Wikipedia pages of notable people born or educated in King's Lynn, or prominent there or nationally.

Armed forces
Florence Green (1901–2012), last known female veteran of World War I
John Mason (1586–1635), naval captain and coloniser

Entertainment
Robert Armin (c. 1563–1615), actor
Mrs. Bernard Beere (1851–1915), actress
Victoria Bush (born 1978), actress and comedian
Michael Caine (born 1933), actor, was evacuated to King's Lynn in World War II and attended King Edward VII School.
Zara Dawson (born 1983), actress and television presenter
Stephen Fry (born 1957), actor, writer, television presenter and film director
Richard Meek (born 1982), actor in musical theatre
Miranda Raison (born 1977), actress
Lucy Verasamy (born 1980), weather forecaster, currently employed by ITV National Weather
Mark Wheat (living), presenter on The Current from Minnesota Public Radio

Exploration
Adam Thoroughgood (1604–1640), colonist and community leader in the Colony of Virginia
George Vancouver (1757–1798), naval officer known for exploring North-West Coast of North America
John Smith (explorer) (c. 1580–1631), Admiral of New England and English soldier, explorer and author
Thomas Baines (1820–1875), artist and explorer of British colonial southern Africa and Australia
Samuel Gurney Cresswell (1827–1867), first naval officer to cross the entire Northwest Passage

Fine art
Odile Crick (1920–2007), artist and illustrator
Walter Dexter (1876-1958), oil painter and water colourist
Alison Dunhill (born 1950), artist, art historian and poet
Robert Elwes (1818-1878), painter and traveller
Ruth Roche, Baroness Fermoy (1908–1993), founder of King's Lynn Festival of Arts
Samuel Lane (1780–1859), portrait painter
Edward Villiers Rippingille (c. 1790–1859), oil painter and water colourist

Literature and journalism
Emily Bell (born 1965), journalist and academic
Frances Burney (1752–1840), novelist and diarist
James Burney (1750–1821), naval historian
Sarah Burney (1772–1844), novelist
Suzanne Francis (born 1959), scifi and fantasy author
Ian Hamilton (1938–2001), critic, biographer and poet
Hardiman Scott (1920–1999), crime writer, poet and broadcaster
John Timpson (1928–2005), journalist and broadcaster

Miscellaneous
Michael Carroll (lottery winner) (born 1983), binman who won £9.7 million on the UK National Lottery in 2002

Music
Charles Burney (1726–1814), organist in King's Lynn, composer and musicologist
Gerry Conway (musician) (born 1952), folk and rock drummer and percussionist
Clara Dow (1883–1969), operatic soprano
Pieter Hellendaal (1721–1799), organist in King's Lynn, composer and violinist
George Kiallmark (1781–1835), violinist and composer
Roger Taylor (born 1949), drummer for the rock band Queen
David Thaxton (born 1982), singer and actor
Craig Powell (musician) (born 1984), singer/songwriter

Politics and diplomacy
Denys Bullard (1912–1994), Conservative politician and agriculturalist
Thomas Cromwell (Parliamentary diarist) (c. 1540 – c. 1611), politician and parliamentary diarist
Maurice Roche, 4th Baron Fermoy (1885–1955), Conservative politician
Sir William ffolkes, 3rd Baronet (1847–1912), Liberal politician
Holcombe Ingleby (1854–1926), Conservative politician and mayor
Weston Jarvis (1855–1939), Conservative politician and army officer
Clare Sewell Read (1826–1905), Conservative politician and agriculturalist
George Ridley (1886–1944), Labour politician
Oliver Simmonds (1897–1975), Conservative politician and aircraft engineer
Sir Robert Walpole (1676–1745), Whig statesman generally regarded as Britain's first prime minister
Graham Woodwark (1874–1938), Liberal politician and mayor

Religion
John Arrowsmith (scholar) (1602–1659), theologian and academic
John Barret (theologian) (died 1563), Lynn's "Vicar of Bray", Carmelite friar, then Protestant cleric and theologian
John Capgrave (1393–1464), hagiographer and scholastic theologian
Harvey Goodwin (1818–1891), bishop and academic
William Gurnall (1616–1679), religious writer
Margery Kempe (c. 1373 – after 1438), mystic and pilgrim, author of possibly the earliest autobiography in English
Thomas Pyle (1674–1756), cleric and controversialist
William Richards (minister) (1749–1818), Baptist minister and local historian

Science and scholarship
Eugene Aram (1704–1759), philologist and murderer
William Baly (1814–1861), physician and fellow of the Royal Society
Henry Bell (architect) (1647–1711), architect and mayor
G. G. Coulton (1858–1947), historian
Guy Dawber (1861–1938), Arts and Crafts-style architect
Charles Wycliffe Goodwin (1817–1887), Egyptologist and judge
Francis Goodwin (architect) (1784–1835), architect
John Harvey (astrologer) (1564–1592), physician and astrologer
Charles Edward Hubbard (1900–1980), botanist and world authority on grasses
Benjamin Keene (1697–1757), ambassador
George William Manby (1765–1854), inventor and author
Tom Petch (1870–1948), mycologist and plant pathologist
Simon Thurley (born 1962), academic and architectural historian
Charles Vancouver (c. 1756 – c. 1815), writer on agriculture

Sport
George Russell (racing driver) (born 1998), racing driver for Mercedes-AMG Petronas Formula One Team
Martin Brundle (born 1959), racing driver and F1 commentator for ITV Sport and the BBC
Fred Fayers, (1890–1954), international football player
Lewis Jarvis, (1857–1938), all-round athlete and banker
Kathryn Johnson (field hockey Britain) (born 1967), Olympic field hockey player
Nicholas "Nick" Aldis (known professionally as Magnus (wrestler)) (born 1986), professional wrestler and actor
Peter Parfitt (born 1936), test cricketer
Barbara Parker (athlete), Olympic track and field athlete
Lucy Pearson (cricketer), test cricketer
Martin Saggers (born 1972), test cricketer
James Sherlock (golfer) (1875–1966), Open Championship golfer
Helen Slatter (born 1970), Olympic swimmer
Dave Taylor (wrestler) (born 1957), champion wrestler
Stan Worthington (1905–1973), test cricketer

See also
List of buildings in King's Lynn
List of events in King's Lynn

References

 
King's Lynn